The Play's the Thing may refer to:

 "The play's the thing", a quotation from Shakespeare's play Hamlet Act 2 Scene 2
 Actors Studio (TV series), a 1948-50 American television series later retitled The Play's the Thing
 The Play's the Thing (TV series), a 1974 Canadian television series
 The Play's the Thing (play), an adaptation by P. G. Wodehouse of The Play at the Castle by Ferenc Molnár
 "The Play's the Thing", an episode of Arthur
 "The Play's the Thing" (SpongeBob SquarePants), an episode of SpongeBob SquarePants